Atlantico is the fifth studio album by Italian singer-songwriter Marco Mengoni, released by Sony Music Italy on 30 November 2018. The album was preceded by the singles "Voglio" and "Buona vita", simultaneously released in Italy on 19 October 2018.

After recording three albums with Michele Canova, Mengoni worked with several different producers on Atlantico, including Mauro Pagani, Rudimental, Takagi & Ketra and El Guincho. This resulted in a heterogeneus album, with electropop tracks as well as acoustic songs, also mixing Latin sounds and rock influneces, in order to reflect Mengoni's latest trips and personal experiences.

A Spanish-language version of the album, titled Atlántico, was released on 18 January 2019.

Track listing

Charts

Weekly charts

Year-end charts

Certifications

References

2018 albums
Italian-language albums
Marco Mengoni albums